The 1900 Cornell Big Red football team was an American football team that represented Cornell University during the 1900 college football season.  In their second season under head coach Percy Haughton, the Big Red compiled a 10–2 record and outscored all opponents by a combined total of 167 to 55. Two Cornell players received honors on the 1900 College Football All-America Team: fullback Raymond Starbuck (Caspar Whitney-1); and tackle Edward R. Alexander (Walter Camp-3).

Schedule

References

Cornell
Cornell Big Red football seasons
Cornell Big Red football